Anatoly Yakovlevich Kartashov (25 August 1932  11 December 2005) was a cosmonaut in the Soviet Vostok program.

Early life and personal life 
Anatoly Yakovlevich Kartashov was born to Yerfrosinya Timofeyevna and Yavok Prokofyevich Kartashov on August 25, 1932. Kartashov was born in the village of Pervoye Sadovoye in the Sadovoye district. He married and had two daughters with Yuliya Sergeyevna. Kartashov's first daughter Ludmila was born in 1960 and his second daughter Svetlana was born in 1967.

Education and career
Kartashov would be unable to complete his secondary education until 1948 due to the war conflict in their region. Following the completion of his secondary schooling he studied at Voronezh Aviation College. Kartashov completed his education at Voronezh Aviation College in 1952 and was subsequently called into the military. He continued his education at Chuguyev Higher Air Force School and in 1954 achieved the rank of lieutenant. In the same year Kartashov would go on to become a fighter pilot. On February 19, 1957 Kartashov was awarded the rank of senior lieutenant and earned the position as chief pilot within the 722nd Fighter Aviation Regiment. He was also a parachuting instructor and logged the most jumps for any of the first men who were selected as cosmonauts.

Anatoly Kartashov, though qualified, was never selected to go into space due to health reasons. Kartashov had initially been trained to be selected as a cosmonaut to go in one of the Vostok missions. It is reported that Yuri Gagarin, one of the men who would be selected for a Vostok mission, thought that Kartashov was one of the best men in training.

References

Soviet cosmonauts
1932 births
2005 deaths